Dorothée Chellier (1860-1935), was a French-Algerian physician.

She became the first female physician in Algeria in 1895.

References

1860 births
Algerian physicians
1935 deaths
19th-century French physicians
19th-century women physicians
19th-century Algerian women